Churiwal (चूरीवाल) is a surname in Agarwal Caste of Hindu community found throughout northern, central and western India, mainly in the states of Rajasthan, Haryana, Punjab, Chandigarh, Himachal Pradesh, Uttarakhand, Delhi, Chhattisgarh, Gujarat and Uttar Pradesh.

See also 

 Agrawal
 Bania (caste)
 Gahoi

References 

 Ujjainee Roy (13 March 2020) "Devika Churiwal's newest line-up brings the beloved batik into luxury cocktail wear"
 Simply Wall St (September 30, 2019) Shubha Churiwal Just Sold A Bunch Of Shares In HEG Limited (NSE:HEG)
 Churiwal Surname Origin

Surnames
Indian surnames
Bania communities
Gotras of Agarwal